David White RBSA is an artist trained at the Birmingham College of Art. Initially, he was a teacher although he retired early in 1996 to become a full-time artist. He has since exhibited his works throughout the Midlands in locations such as Birmingham, Lichfield and Stratford-upon-Avon.

He has developed a personal style of painting by combining collage techniques and oil-based printing. White has been a Member of the Royal Birmingham Society of Artists since 2003. He is also an elected Member of Easel Club and the Birmingham Art Circle.

References

External links
 

Members and Associates of the Royal Birmingham Society of Artists
Living people
Place of birth missing (living people)
Year of birth missing (living people)